Volleyball events were contested at the 1938 Central American and Caribbean Games in Panama City, Panama.

References
 

1938 Central American and Caribbean Games
1938
1938 in volleyball
International volleyball competitions hosted by Panama